Piramenthal is a small river in Northern Province, Sri Lanka. The river rises in northern Mullaitivu District, before flowing north through Mullaitivu District and Kilinochchi District. The river empties into Chundikkulam Lagoon.

See also 
 List of rivers in Sri Lanka

References 

Rivers of Sri Lanka
Bodies of water of Kilinochchi District
Bodies of water of Mullaitivu District